The Eastern Sierra is a region in California comprising the eastern side of the Sierra Nevada, which includes Mono and Inyo Counties. The main thoroughfare is U.S. Route 395, which passes through Bridgeport, Lee Vining, Bishop, Big Pine, Independence, Lone Pine, and Olancha, with Bishop being the largest city in the area. It is sparsely populated but well known for its scenery; major points of interest include Mono Lake, Bodie, Mammoth Lakes, Manzanar, and parts of Yosemite National Park and Death Valley National Park.

External links 

Mono County Tourism Info
Eastern Sierra Visitor Center

Tourism regions of California
Sierra Nevada (United States)
Great Basin